Zinc transporter ZIP6 is a protein that in humans is encoded by the SLC39A6 gene.

Zinc is an essential cofactor for hundreds of enzymes. It is involved in protein, nucleic acid, carbohydrate, and lipid metabolism, as well as in the control of gene transcription, growth, development, and differentiation. SLC39A6 belongs to a subfamily of proteins that show structural characteristics of zinc transporters (Taylor and Nicholson, 2003).[supplied by OMIM]

See also
 Solute carrier family

References

Further reading

Solute carrier family